Santo Tomás is a municipality in the San Salvador department of El Salvador. 

Municipalities of the San Salvador Department